The space program of Kazakhstan is originated from the dissolution of the Soviet Union in 1991, when Kazakhstan declared their independence. The Kazakh space program consist of cosmonaut and satellite missions. The only launch site situated at Kazakhstan is Baikonur Cosmodrome, which is leased to Russia. The program is led by KazCosmos since 2007.

History 
The first Kazakh person to go to space is Toktar Aubakirov in 1991, followed by Talgat Musabayev in 1994. On 7 January 2000, the government of Kazakhstan decreed it would form a cosmonaut corps. Out of 2000 candidates, two were selected, Aidyn Aimbetov and Mukhtar Aymakhanov, in 2002. Aymakhanov left Kazakhstan in 2012 to become a Russian citizen to pursue a cosmonaut career. Aimbetov was selected for Soyuz TMA-18M/Soyuz TMA-16M in June 2015.

On 18 June 2006, the KazSat-1 was launched from Baikonur Cosmodrome, marking the beginning of Kazakhstan's independent inflight space operations. In 2008 communications with the satellite ended, and it was declared lost. The next satellite, KazSat-2, experienced a series of delays, but was launched on 16 July 2011 on board a Proton rocket. KazSat-2 was built by Krunichev and Thales Alenia Space. KazCosmos signed a contract with ISS-Reshetnev and Thales Alenia Space Italy on 21 June 2011 for the third telecommunications satellite, named KazSat-3 and launched it in 2014. Two more satellites, KazEOSat 2 and Al Farabi-1, were launched in 29 June 2014 and 15 February 2017, respectively.

Launch site

References